Mycena lazulina is a bioluminescent species of mushroom in the genus Mycena and family Mycenaceae.

It was first described in 2016 from southwestern Japan. The specific epithetic, lazulina, is Latin for blue (c.f. lapis lazuli).

See also
 List of bioluminescent fungi

References

External links
 
 
 Mycena lazulina in Mycobank
 Gallery of images at The Forum of Fungi

lazulina
Fungi described in 2016